Todd Holland (born August 13, 1961) is an American film and television director and producer. He directed over 50 episodes of The Larry Sanders Show, for which he received an Emmy, and 26 episodes of Malcolm in the Middle, for which he received two Emmy Awards. His feature films include The Wizard (1989) and Krippendorf's Tribe (1998).

Early life and education
Holland was born in Kittanning, Pennsylvania and raised in Meadville, Pennsylvania. He was an honor student, graduating from Meadville Area Sr. High School-M. A. S. H. While there, he wrote, directed and produced several parodies of movies popular at the time. He graduated in 1985 from UCLA's school of Theater, Film and Television.

Career
Holland got his career break when Steven Spielberg saw his UCLA thesis film Chicken Thing—a 12-minute comedy horror short—and hired Holland to write and direct on the second season of Amazing Stories.

Holland directed 52 episodes of The Larry Sanders Show for HBO. He received an Emmy for the series finale "FLIP".

Holland then started working with Linwood Boomer on the Fox sitcom Malcolm in the Middle where he directed 26 episodes and served as co-executive producer for the show. Holland earned two Emmy Awards for the show: both wins were for Outstanding Directing for a Comedy Series, his first one for the pilot episode of the series, the second for the season two episode "Bowling"—for which he also won the DGA award for excellence in comedy directing.

Holland co-created Wonderfalls with Bryan Fuller, for which they received a WGA nomination.

He has also directed the feature films The Wizard, Krippendorf's Tribe and Firehouse Dog.

Holland has directed twice for the NBC sitcom 30 Rock. He directed the episode "Generalissimo," an episode for which he received his seventh Emmy Award nomination, but lost to Jeffrey Blitz for The Office.

Holland worked with Justin Berfield, with whom he had worked on  Malcolm in the Middle, on Sons of Tucson, a 2010 Fox television sitcom. He directed five of the thirteen episodes and executive produced the series.

Two of his shows were named in TV Guide's "100 greatest Episodes of Television", the  "Everybody Loves Larry" episode of The Larry Sanders Show and the "Life Of Brian" episode of My So-Called Life.

Personal life
Holland has been married to actor and singer Scotch Ellis Loring since 2008. The couple are fathers to triplets, born in 2010 via a surrogate.

Filmography
Feature films
 The Wizard (1989)
 Krippendorf's Tribe (1998)
 Firehouse Dog (2007)

TV movies
 Five Houses (1998)
 Kilroy (1998)
 Ball & Chain (2001)
 The Time Tunnel (2004)
 Amy Coyne (2006)
 Fugly (2007)
 Isabel (2012)
 The Pro (2014)
 Furst Born (2016)
 Charlie Foxtrot (2017)
 Steps (2018)
 Monster High: The Movie (2022)

TV series

References

External links

1961 births
Living people
People from Kittanning, Pennsylvania
American television directors
LGBT film directors
LGBT television directors
LGBT producers
LGBT people from Pennsylvania
People from Crawford County, Pennsylvania
UCLA Film School alumni
Film directors from Pennsylvania
Primetime Emmy Award winners
Directors Guild of America Award winners